Bushinsky may refer to:

Aviv Bushinsky (1967- ) Israeli journalist and businessman, son of Jay Bushinsky.
Jay Bushinsky (1932–2018) American journalist
Shay Bushinsky, Israeli chess player and software developer, son of Jay Bushinsky.

References